Yussuf Abu-Warda (born 19 August 1953 in Jish) is an Arab-Israeli Maronite actor. A leading actor from 1999 he was head of Al-Midan Theater in Haifa.

In October 2018, he received a life achievement award from the Union of Israeli Performing Artists.

Filmography
On a Narrow Bridge
1984 : Magash Hakesef
1985 : Gesher Tzar Me'od
1986 : Nadia
1987 : *Noce en Galilée (Urs al-jalil)  Michel Khleifi : Bacem ( Youssef Abou Warda)
1991 : Cup Final (Gmar Gavi'a)  Eran Riklis : George (comme Youssef Abou Warda)
1998 : Yom Yom Amos Gitaï : Yussuf
1999 : Aaron Cohen's Debt, TV film : Taylor (credited Youssef Abou Warda)
1999 : Kadosh directed Amos Gitaï : Rav Shimon
1999 : La Voie lactée (Shvil Hahalav) d'Ali Nasser : Gouverneur
2002 : Kedma Amos Gitai : L’Arabe
2003 : Tik Sagur TV series : father of Benny
2003 : Afarsek : taxi driver
2004 : Shnat Effes : employee of job agency
2004 : Promised Land, Amos Gitaï : Yussuf
2004 : Bizman Emet (TV film) : as Turgeman, directeur adjoint du Mossad
2005 : Ahava Me'ever Lapina (TV series) : Ze'ev
2007 : HaModedim
2007 : Désengagement Amos Gitaï : as Youssef
2008 : For My Father (Sof Shavua B'Tel Aviv : Week-end à Tel Aviv) de Dror Zahavi : Saleh
2009 : Amerrika de Cherien Dabis : Nabeel Halaby
2009 : Hatsuya (TV series) : Ardak
2007- 2011 : Ha-Borer (TV series) : Amram 'Bulldog'
2012 : Héritage (Inheritance)  Hiam Abbass : Khalil
2013 : Ana Arabia Amos Gitaï
2014 : The Savior  as Luke
2015 : 3000 Nights
2017 : Holy Air
2019 : The Dead of Jaffa

References

External links

1953 births
Living people
Beit Zvi School for the Performing Arts alumni
Israeli Arab Christians
20th-century Israeli male actors
21st-century Israeli male actors
Israeli male film actors
Israeli male stage actors
Arab citizens of Israel